The Best of UB40 – Volume Two is a compilation album by English Reggae group UB40, released in 1995. In 2005 the album was re-released as a two double pack.
The Best of UB40 – Volume Two peaked at number 91 on Germany Charts.

Reception 

Stephen Thomas Erlewine from AllMusic feels that with the focus of the collection on the group's "pop-reggae crossovers" from the 1990s "fans of UB40's political edge and their genuine reggae roots won't find much of interest here." However, he does believe it represents "a good summation of the band's second decade".

US track listing

UK track listing

Charts

Weekly charts

Year-end charts

Certifications and sales

References 

UB40 compilation albums
1995 compilation albums
Virgin Records compilation albums